An Hour with the Ramsey Lewis Trio is an album by Ramsey Lewis' Trio, recorded in 1959 and released on the Argo label.

Track listing
 "Softly, as in a Morning Sunrise" (Oscar Hammerstein II, Sigmund Romberg) - 7:38   
 "C.C. Rider" (Traditional) - 2:38   
 "Love for Sale" (Cole Porter) - 4:22   
 "I Had the Craziest Dream/I Know Why" (Mack Gordon, Harry Warren/Buddy Bregman, Morgan, Davis) - 6:37   
 "It Ain't Necessarily So" (George Gershwin, Ira Gershwin) - 4:40   
 "I Love Paris" (Porter) - 2:10   
 "The Way You Look Tonight" (Dorothy Fields, Jerome Kern) - 8:07  
 "Song of India" (Nikolai Rimsky-Korsakov) - 2:31   
 "Consider the Source" (Ramsey Lewis, Eldee Young) - 4:00   
 "The Ruby and the Pearl" (Ray Evans, Jay Livingston) - 5:50   
 "Walls of Jericho" (Traditional) - 3:26  
 "Angel Eyes" (Earl Brent, Matt Dennis) - 5:00

Personnel 
Ramsey Lewis - piano
El Dee Young - bass
Issac "Red" Holt - drums

Versions
 An Hour With The Ramsey Lewis Trio (LP, Album, Mono), Argo Records, US, 1959
 An Hour With The Ramsey Lewis Trio (LP, Album, Blu), Argo Records, US, 1959
 An Hour With The Ramsey Lewis Trio (LP, Album, Gol), Argo Records, US, 1959
 An Hour With The Ramsey Lewis Trio (LP, Album, RE), Cadet Records, Japan, 1983
 An Hour With The Ramsey Lewis Trio (LP, Album, RE), Cadet Records US
 An Hour With The Ramsey Lewis Trio (LP, RE), Cadet Records, US

References 

1959 albums
Ramsey Lewis albums
Argo Records albums